International Festival of Comics or International Comics Festival may refer to:

International Festival of Comics and Games, Poland
Angoulême International Comics Festival, France
Algiers International Comics Festival, Algeria
Fumetto International Comics Festival, Switzerland
International Comics Festival "Salon stripa", Serbia

See also